Bentley John Heddle (15 September 1943 – 19 December 1989) was a British Conservative Party politician.

Political career
Heddle contested Gateshead West in February 1974, being beaten by Labour's John Horam. In October 1974 he stood in Bolton East, but was again defeated.

He was Member of Parliament for Lichfield and Tamworth from 1979 to 1983, and for Mid Staffordshire from 1983.

Death
Early on 19 December 1989, Heddle was found dead in his car in a chalk pit near Chartham in Kent. A hose was found connected to the car's exhaust pipe. The death was ruled a suicide; he reportedly killed himself due to the indebtedness of his property businesses. The subsequent by-election was won by Labour's Sylvia Heal.

References 
 The Times Guide to the House of Commons, Times Newspapers Ltd, 1987

External links 
 

1943 births
1989 deaths
1989 suicides
20th-century British businesspeople
British politicians who committed suicide
Conservative Party (UK) MPs for English constituencies
People educated at Bishop's Stortford College
Suicides by carbon monoxide poisoning
Suicides in England
UK MPs 1979–1983
UK MPs 1983–1987
UK MPs 1987–1992